Technological University, Dawei situated at Dawei District, Taninthayi Region, Myanmar with the area of 90.8 arcas. It was formerly opened as Government Technical College (GTC) on 2 December 1999 and has been promoted to University level on 20 January 2007. Technological University (Dawei) offers the following engineering degree programs:Post Graduate Degree, Graduate Degree, Under Graduate Degree. Technological University (Dawei) provides laboratory equipment for every majors and also provides language lab room to improve English communication skill.

Departments
 Civil Engineering Department
 Mechanical Engineering Department
 Electrical Power Engineering Department
 Electronic and Communication Engineering Department
 Engineering Physics Department
 Engineering Chemistry Department
 Engineering Mathematics Department
 English Department

Degree programs

Technological universities in Myanmar